Sachin Gupta  (born March 17, 1982) is a former American professional basketball executive who is the executive vice president of basketball operations for the Minnesota Timberwolves.

Early life 
Gupta earned an electrical engineering and computer science degree from MIT, and an MBA degree from the Stanford Graduate School of Business.

While working for ESPN in 2006, Gupta created the 'NBA Trade Machine' on the network website to give users the opportunity to virtually play the role of general manager. The website aggregates current player contracts and integrates the rules of the NBA Collective Bargaining Agreement to correctly assess whether a trade is possible given the salary cap restrictions and the myriad other restrictions in the CBA. The idea for the website came from Jack Ramsey's son, Chris Ramsey.

Executive career 
Gupta started his career as a special advisor (2006–13) to GM Daryl Morey with the Houston Rockets, switched to consultant (2013) and VP of basketball operations with the Philadelphia 76ers (2014–16) under Sam Hinkie, and transitioned to assistant general manager (2018–19) with the Detroit Pistons.

In 2018, Daryl Morey said, "Sachin's fingerprints are all over this time, from his first six seasons with the Rockets to contributions he's made this past year."

In May 2019, the Minnesota Timberwolves named Gupta as the new EVP of Basketball Operations under president Gersson Rosas.  Gupta provides specialized expertise on the NBA Collective Bargaining Agreement and team analytics.

General Manager Scott Layden said, “Sachin makes the team better because we know that we have in front of us, a guy who was really a great friend, but also we know he's the smartest guy in the room who can help us and steer us in the right direction.”

Rosas said, “Sachin is an extremely talented basketball mind who brings a diverse and unique background to our staff...has been more than just a numbers guy in Minnesota...went on regular scouting trips, as well as being more than willing to be involved in film sessions with coaches and players.”

On September 22, 2021, shortly after Rosas was relieved of his duties as President of Basketball Operations, Gupta was promoted as the new interim President of Basketball Operations, while keeping his role as EVP of Basketball Operations.

See also 
List of National Basketball Association team presidents

References

Living people
National Basketball Association executives
1985 births